Postal codes in Japan are 7-digit numeric codes using the format NNN-NNNN, where N is a digit.  The first two digits refer to one of the 47 prefectures (for example, 40 for the Yamanashi Prefecture), the next digit for one of a set of adjacent cities in the prefecture (408 for Hokuto, Yamanashi) the next two for a neighborhood and the last for a town or other subdivision (408-0301 to 408-0307 for the Mukawa-chō neighborhood in Hokuto).

External links
Japan Postal Code Lookup, globefeed.com
JapanPostalCode.net
The Complete List of Japan Zip Codes

Japan
Postal system of Japan